Fatick Department is one of the 45 departments of Senegal, one of the three departments making up the Fatick Region, and lies on the road between Mbour and Kaolack. The Fatick region is home to many Sereer people; the Sereers are one of the major ethnic groups in Senegal and there are four Sereer dialects. Fatick town is the major urban center for the region.

Administrative divisions
There are two communes in the department: Diofior and Fatick.

The rural districts (Communautés rurales) comprise:
 Arrondissement of Diakhao:
 Diakhao
 Diaoulé
 Mbéllacadiao
 Ndiob
 Thiaré Ndialgui
 Arrondissement de Fimela:
 Djilasse
 Fimela
 Loul Sessène
 Palmarin Facao
 Arrondissement de Niakhar:
 Niakhar
 Ngayokhène
 Patar Sine
 Arrondissement de Tattaguine
 Diarrère
 Diouroup
 Tattaguine

Historic sites

Fatick town
 Mbind Ngo Mindiss, site of offerings, situated on an arm of the sea, the Sine
 Diobaye, site of traditional ceremonies
 Jab Ndeb, sacred tree, at Ndiaye-Ndiaye
 Lutheran Mission building
 Prefecture building
 Tribunal building

Diakhao
 Royal house
 Tomb of Bour Sine Coumba Ndoffène Fa Maak
 Tombs of the Guélwars
 Tombs of the Linguères at Diakhao Thioupane
 Kanger baobab tree of Diakhao, site of the offerings by the Kings of Sine
 Mausoleum of Maba Diakhou Bâ at Mbel Fandane

Fimela
 Tomb of Meïssa Waly Dione at Mbissel
 Wells and Mosque of El Hadji Omar at Simal
 Senghor Family House at Djilor Djidiack

Niakhar
 Tumulus of Yenguélé
 Raised posts at Niakhar related to initiation
 Raised posts at Mboul related to initiation
 Fasaw, fangool (ancestral spirit) of the land of Njaafaaj

Tattaguine
 Remains of the Bour Sine Salmon Faye house in the village of Khodjil-Ndiongolor
 Raised posts at Bikol
 Gouye Géwel baobab tree at Toucar and Senghor
 Harwak, fangool of the maternal family Coofan at Fayil

References

Departments of Senegal
Fatick Region